Katherine de la Pole, Countess of Suffolk (born around 1376 – 8 April 1419) was a daughter of Hugh de Stafford, 2nd Earl of Stafford, and his wife Lady Philippa de Beauchamp. By her marriage to Michael de la Pole, 2nd Earl of Suffolk, she became known as the Countess of Suffolk.

Family
Katherine was one of nine children born to Hugh de Stafford, 2nd Earl of Stafford and his wife Philippa de Beauchamp. Some of her siblings included Margaret de Stafford, Countess of Westmorland and Edmund Stafford, 5th Earl of Stafford.

Her paternal grandparents were Ralph Stafford, 1st Earl of Stafford and Margaret de Audley. Her maternal grandparents were Thomas de Beauchamp, 11th Earl of Warwick and Katherine Mortimer, a daughter of Roger Mortimer, 1st Earl of March. Through his paternal and maternal grandmothers, she was descended from Edward I and John, King of England respectively.

Marriage and children
Katherine was married to Michael de la Pole, 2nd Earl of Suffolk in April 1383. He was a son of Michael de la Pole, 1st Earl of Suffolk and Katherine Wingfield. They had the following issue, the eldest of whom would not be born until 1394, eleven years after their marriage: 
Michael de la Pole, 3rd Earl of Suffolk (1394–1415)
William de la Pole, 1st Duke of Suffolk (1396–1450)
Sir Alexander de la Pole (d. 1429), killed at the Battle of Jargeau
Sir John de la Pole (d. 1429), died a prisoner in France.
Sir Thomas de la Pole (aft. 1397-1433), a clerk, died in France while a hostage for his brother William. He had an illegitimate daughter and heiress Katherine de la Pole (1416–1488, buried in Rowley Abbey, Oxfordshire), second wife of Sir Miles Stapleton, and had issue
Katherine de la Pole, abbess at Barking
Isabel de la Pole (d. 1466), married Thomas de Morley, 5th Baron Morley, and had issue
Elizabeth de la Pole, married first Edward Burnell, son of Hugh Burnell, 2nd Baron Burnell, second Sir Thomas Kerdeston

Michael died on 18 September 1415, from the flux. Katherine died four years later, on 8 April 1419.

Ancestry

References

Works cited

1419 deaths
14th-century births
Daughters of British earls
Suffolk
14th-century English women
14th-century English people
15th-century English women
15th-century English people